Prince Johann Georg of Hohenzollern (Johann Georg Carl Leopold Eitel-Friedrich Meinrad Maria Hubertus Michael; 31 July 1932 – 2 March 2016) was a German prince, and through his marriage to Princess Birgitta of Sweden, was brother-in-law of King Carl XVI Gustaf of Sweden.

Prince Johann Georg was the sixth child of Frederick, Prince of Hohenzollern (Heiligendamm 30 August 1891 – Krauchenwies 6 February 1965) and his wife Princess Margarete Karola of Saxony (Dresden 24 January 1900 – Freiburg im Breisgau 16 October 1962).

Biography

Family
The House of Hohenzollern also produced rulers of the Kingdom of Romania. King Carol I of Romania was the first king of Romania born as a Prince of Hohenzollern-Sigmaringen.  He was followed by his nephew Ferdinand I of Romania (1865–1927), who was adopted as heir in 1889 by his uncle and succeeded as King in 1914 upon his uncle's death. Ferdinand became the father of King Carol II of Romania and grandfather of Michael I of Romania (1921–2017), the last reigning member of the Royal Family of Romania.

Johann Georg, known as "Hansi", had six siblings: 
 Benedikta, who married Heinrich count of Waldburg zu Wolfegg und Waldsee; 
 Maria Aldegunde, married to Werner Hess; 
 Maria Theresia; 
 Friedrich Wilhelm, Prince of Hohenzollern who married Princess Margarita of Leiningen; 
 Franz Joseph who married first Princess Maria Ferdinande von Thurn und Taxis and second Princess Diane of Bourbon-Parma; 
 Prince Ferfied, married to Maja Meinert.

Marriage
Johann Georg met Princess Birgitta of Sweden, the sister of the current King of Sweden Carl XVI Gustaf in 1959 at a cocktail party while visiting friends and relatives in Germany.

On 15 December 1960, their engagement was announced by the Royal Palace of Stockholm. The civil marriage ceremony took place at the Royal Palace of Stockholm on 25 May 1961, and the religious wedding in the Sankt Johann Church at the bridegroom's family palace of Sigmaringen on 30 May/31 July 1961.

Johann Georg and Birgitta separated in 1990, though they remained legally married and attended Swedish royal family events together, including the 2010 wedding of Crown Princess Victoria. They celebrated their golden wedding in 2011.

Children
Johann Georg and Birgitta's marriage produced three children:

Prince Carl Christian of Hohenzollern (b. 5 April 1962 in Munich, Bavaria, Germany), married Nicole Helene Neschitsch (b. 22 January 1968, Munich) on 26 July 1999 in Kreuzpullach. They have one son:
Nikolas, Prince of Hohenzollern (b. 22 November 1999)
Princess Désirée of Hohenzollern (b. 27 November 1963, Munich). She married firstly, Heinrich Franz Josef Georg Maria, Hereditary Count of Ortenburg (b. 11 October 1956, Bamberg) on 21 September 1998 in Weitramsdorf. They had three children before divorcing in 2002. Married secondly Eckbert von Bohlen und Halbach (b. 1956).
Carl Theodor, Count of Ortenburg (b. 21 February 1992, Lichtenfels)
Friedrich-Hubertus, Count of Ortenburg (b. 7 February 1995, Lichtenfels)
Carolina, Countess of Ortenburg (b. 1997)
Prince Hubertus of Hohenzollern (b. 10 June 1966 in Munich), married Uta Maria König (b. Trier 25 February 1964).

Career
Johann Georg lived in Grünwald, Munich and was a fine art expert.

From 1992 to 1998 he served as Director General of the Bavarian State Picture Collection and was also a director of the Hypo-Kunsthalle of the Hypo Cultural Foundation.

He served as a Member of Advisory Board - Europe at Christie's International plc.

A patron of the arts, his 75th birthday was celebrated with a special concert in Munich.

Honours

Dynastic
  House of Hohenzollern: Knight Grand Cross with Chain of the Princely House Order of Hohenzollern

National
 : Officer of the Order of Merit of the Federal Republic of Germany  
 : Member of the Decoration of Merit<

Foreign
 : Commander of the Order of Arts and Letters, 1st Class
 
  Castroan Royal Family of Two Sicilies: Knight Grand Cross of Justice of the Two Sicilian Sacred Military Constantinian Order of Saint George
 : Knight of the Royal Order of the Seraphim
 : Recipient of the Wedding Medal of Crown Princess Victoria to Daniel Westling

Ancestry

References

1932 births
2016 deaths
People from Sigmaringen
People from the Province of Hohenzollern
House of Hohenzollern-Sigmaringen
Princes of Hohenzollern-Sigmaringen
Officers Crosses of the Order of Merit of the Federal Republic of Germany
Recipients of the Ordre des Arts et des Lettres
Commandeurs of the Ordre des Arts et des Lettres
People of the Weimar Republic